RK Bosna Sarajevo is a team handball club based in Centar, Sarajevo, Sarajevo Canton, the capital of Bosnia and Herzegovina. It is part of the USD Bosna organization with headquarter located at Hamze Hume 2, Sarajevo 71000, Bosnia and Herzegovina.

Home games are played in the Mala dvorana Mirza Delibašić KSC Skenderija, Olimpijska dvorana Ramiz Salčin Mojmilo in Novi Grad and the Velika dvorana Mirza Delibašić KSC Skenderija is used when the club is playing more important matches. The club competes in the Handball Championship of Bosnia and Herzegovina and has been dominating the league in the last couple of years, being totally superior the other teams. The good results has given the club an opportunity to play in the best European handball tournaments. RK Bosna Sarajevo has been a participant of the EHF Champions League three years in a row but without any notable results.

Their most impressive result was achieved in the 2006-2007 season, after being eliminated in the EHF Champions League they got the chance to play in the EHF Cup Winner's Cup. RK Bosna Sarajevo reached the semi-finals but were eliminated by the German side HSV Handball.

Accomplishments
Handball Championship of Bosnia and Herzegovina: 7
Winner: 2002-2003, 2005-2006, 2006-2007, 2007-2008, 2008-2009, 2009-2010, 2010-2011
Runner-Up: 2003-2004, 2004-2005
First League of Federation of Bosnia and Herzegovina - South: 1
Winner: 2020-21
Handball Cup of Bosnia and Herzegovina: 5
Winner: 2002-2003, 2003-2004, 2007-2008, 2008-2009, 2009-2010
Runner-Up: 2006-2007
Yugoslav Handball Cup: 1
Winner: 1962-1963
Runner-Up: 1954-1955, 1955-1956, 1956-1957, 1957-1958, 1965-1966
EHF Cup Winners' Cup
1/2 finals: 2006-2007
EHF Champions League
1/8 finals: 2010-11

Recent seasons

The recent season-by-season performance of the club:

Key

2020-21 Team

Records 2012–2019

Coaching history

 Željko Martinčević
 Sead Hadžiahmetović
 Meho Bašić
 Milan Maksimović (until 4 July 2002)
 Abaz Arslanagić (4 July 2002 – 2003)
 Kasim Kamenica (2004–2005)
 Zoran Dokić (2005–2006)
 Halid Demirović (2006 – 25 July 2007)
 Dragan Marković (25 July 2007 – 4 August 2007)
 Jovica Elezović (7 August 2007 – 13 November 2007)
 Mirko Sušić (13 November 2007 – 27 December 2007)
 Gregor Cvijič (27 December 2007 – 18 November 2008)
 Vojislav Rađa (18 November 2008 –13 July 2009)
 Irfan Smajlagić (13 July 2009 – 27 December 2011)
 Zdenko Antović (6 January 2012 – 21 December 2012)
 Goran Tomić (21 December 2012 – 26 July 2012)
 Zuhdija Korkarić (26 July 2012 – 16 March 2015)
 Goran Tomić (16 March 2015 – 19 September 2015)
 Zuhdija Korkarić (19 September 2015 – 15 July 2016)
 Adem Bašić (18 July 2016 – 24 November 2016)
 Danijel Riđić (25 November 2016 – 28 February 2017)
 Zuhdija Korkarić (28 February 2017 – 22 October 2017)
 Ejub Kukavica (22 October 2017 – 31 December 2017)
 Sanjin Kolaković (2 February 2018 – 24 August 2018)
 Zuhdija Korkarić (24 August 2018 – present)

Chairman's history

Sporting directors

Gordan Muzurović
Ammar Švrakić (26 November 2015 – 19 September 2016)
Fuad Malagić (28 June 2018 – present)

Directors

Mirza Muzurović (2002–2007)
Kenan Magoda (2 December 2009 – 3 July 2012)
Šerif Krajišnik (3 October 2013 – 31 October 2015)
Adnan Branković (13 July 2017 – 28 June 2018)
Fuad Malagić (28 June 2018 – 16 September 2018)
L. Dizdarević (16 September 2018 – present)

Kit

Recent finishes and attendance

References

External links
EHF
Hercegovina 
Klix 
NHT
Oslobođenje 
SCsport 
sport1 
SportDC 
Sport Klub 
SportSport 
The-Sports
USD 
Visoko 

Bosnia and Herzegovina handball clubs
Sport in Sarajevo